Local Route 13 Sinji–Wando Line is a local route of South Korea that connecting Sinji-myeon, Wando County, South Jeolla Province to Wando-eup in Wando County, South Jeolla Province.

History
This route was established on 19 July 1996.

Stopovers
 South Jeolla Province
 Wando County (Sinji-myeon - Wando-eup)

Major intersections 

 (■): Motorway
IS: Intersection, IC: Interchange

South Jeolla Province

See also
 South Jeolla Province
 National Route 13

References

13
Wando County
Roads in South Jeolla